Provincial Trunk Highway 5 (PTH 5) is a provincial primary highway located in the Canadian province of Manitoba.

Besides Roblin, it passes through the communities of Cartwright, Glenboro, Carberry, Neepawa, McCreary, Ste. Rose Du Lac, Grandview, and Gilbert Plains along its route.

The highway, in a section concurrent with PTH 10, bypasses the City of Dauphin. (PTH 5A / 10A does run through Dauphin.)

The segment of PTH 5 between PTH 10 and Ste. Rose Du Lac is part of the Northern Woods and Water Route. Further south, PTH 5 is also the main route through Spruce Woods Provincial Park between Glenboro and Carberry.

PTH 5, along with PTH 20 and PTH 50, has the distinction of being both a north-south and an east-west highway, though PTH 20 is officially designated north-south for its entire route. From the Canada–United States border to PTH 68 east of Ste. Rose du Lac, PTH 5 is designated as a north-south highway. From PTH 68 to the Saskatchewan border, its designation changes to east-west.

Route description

PTH 5 begins at the United States Hansboro-Cartwright Border Crossing, with the road continuing south into Towner County, North Dakota as North Dakota Highway 4 (ND 4). The highway heads north into the Cartwright - Roblin Municipality, traveling along the flat farmland of the prairies to cross a creek and pass through the town of Cartwright, where it junctions with PTH 3 (Boundary Commission Trail). It leaves Cartwright and makes a short, gradual jog to the northeast, where it crosses Badger Creek, before curving due northward again to cross a wooded valley and crosses the Pembina River just west of Rock Lake.

PTH 5 crosses into the Rural Municipality of Argyle in Neelin, climbing out of the valley back into farmland and going through a switch back, immediately having a short concurrency (overlap) with PR 253. The highway heads due north to cross a couple of creeks and have an intersection with PTH 23 near Baldur. It has an intersection with a former section of PR 245 (which leads several kilometers east to Bruxelles) before entering the Municipality of Glenboro - South Cypress in the middle of a switchback.

PTH 5 travels through the town of Glenboro, where it has an intersection with PTH 2 (Red Coat Trail), before winding its way through the woodlands of Spruce Woods Provincial Park for the next several kilometers, where it crosses the Assiniboine River before entering the Municipality of North Cypress - Langford. The highway passes through the town of Carberry, mostly bypassing it along its eastern side as it has an intersection with PR 351 (former PTH 1 / TCH). It leaves Carberry and has an intersection with PTH 1 / Trans-Canada Highway (TCH) before going through a switchback near Wellwood and having an intersection with PR 353. The highway crosses a couple of creeks before traveling just west of Lake Irwin and entering the town of Neepawa. PTH 5 becomes concurrent with PTH 16 (TCH / Yellowhead Highway), at an intersection with along the banks of the Whitemud River, and they head west through neighborhoods along Main Street. They travel along the southern edge of downtown (around the intersection with Mountain Avenue) before passing through more neighborhoods, with PTH 5 breaking off and heading north at the western edge of town, leaving Neepawa and enter the Rural Municipality of Rosedale.

PTH 5 continues nearly due northward for the next several kilometers, having an intersection with PR 471 before passing through Eden, where it shares a short concurrency with PR 265. For the next 50 kilometers, PTH 5 travels parallel to the eastern boundary of Riding Mountain National Park. The highway has intersections with PR 357 and PR 352, where it crosses a creek, before passing through the hamlet of Riding Mountain. It has an intersection with PR 261 before traveling through Kelwood and crossing into the Municipality of McCreary.

PTH 5 has intersections with PTH 19 and PR 462 before passing through the town of McCreary, which it bypasses along its western side to have an intersection with PTH 50 and PR 361. It enters the Municipality of Ste. Rose and has an intersection with PR 480 near Laurier. The highway shares a concurrency with PR 360 before entering the town of Ste. Rose du Lac and immediately having an intersection with PTH 68 in the middle of a sharp curve, where PTH 5 switches cardinal directions from north-south to east-west. PTH 5 bypasses downtown to the south, where it has an intersection with PR 276 and crosses a river, before beginning to parallel the southern shore of Dauphin Lake as it crosses into the Rural Municipality of Lakeshore.

PTH 5 heads west to have another intersection with PR 480 before passing just to the south of Ochre River, where it has an intersection with PTH 20 and PR 582, before crossing the Ochre River and entering the Rural Municipality of Dauphin. The highway leaves Dauphin Lake, becoming concurrent with PTH 10 and the two head north to pass by Lt. Col W.G. (Billy) Barker VC Airport before crossing Edwards Creek and bypassing the city of Dauphin along its southern and western sides, having intersections with PTH 5A / PTH 10A. They have an intersection with PR 274 before crossing into the Gilbert Plains Municipality.

PTH 10 splits off and heads north at a creek crossing near Ashville, with PTH 5 heading west, crossing the Wilson River and traveling through the town of Gilbert Plains, where it has another intersection PR 274. It crosses into the Grandview Municipality and travels up a valley between Duck Mountain Provincial Park and Riding Mountain National Park, where it passes through the town of Grandview, where it has an intersection with PR 366 and crosses the Valley River. PTH 5 travels through the Tootinaowaziibeeng Treaty Reserve as it crosses into the Municipality of Roblin.

PTH 5 has intersections with PR 583, 584, and 591 before traveling straight through the center of the town of Roblin, where it shares an extremely short concurrency with PTH 83. The highway has an intersection with PR 484 before climbing across the Assiniboine River valley (now occupied by the Lake of the Prairies) and crossing the border into Saskatchewan at the intersection with PR 482. The highway continues west as Saskatchewan Highway 10 (Hwy 10) towards Yorkton.

The entire length of Manitoba Provincial Trunk Highway 5 is a rural, two-lane, paved highway.

History
Prior to 1980, the southern terminus for PTH 5 was at PTH 16 (PTH 4 prior to 1977) in Neepawa, making the original length of the highway .

In 1980, the highway was extended to its current southbound terminus, replacing PR 258 between Neepawa and PTH 3 at Cartwright, via Glenboro and Carberry, and PTH 28 between the U.S. border and Cartwright.

The section between PTH 20 and PTH 10 south of Dauphin was completed and opened to traffic in 1959. Prior to this, PTH 5 turned north at Ochre River and entered Dauphin from the east along what is now PTH 20 and PTH 20A. PTH 5 met PTH 10 south in Dauphin's city centre, from which the two highways continued out of the city in concurrence following the current PTH 5A/10A route (2nd Avenue N.W. / Buchanon Ave.).

Major intersections

References

External links 
Official Name and Location - Declaration of Provincial Trunk Highways Regulation - The Highways and Transportation Act - Provincial Government of Manitoba
Official Highway Map - Published and maintained by the Department of Infrastructure - Provincial Government of Manitoba (see Legend and Map#1 & 2)
Google Maps Search - Provincial Trunk Highway 5

005
Northern Woods and Water Route
Dauphin, Manitoba